O.S.C.A. (Officine Specializzate Costruzione Automobili—Fratelli Maserati S.p.A.) was an Italian manufacturer of racing and sports cars established 1947 in San Lazzaro di Savena, Bologna, by the Maserati brothers, and closed down in 1967. The company name is usually written OSCA or Osca.

History
OSCA was founded in 1947 by Ernesto Maserati (engineering manager) and his two brothers Ettore, and Bindo (operations managers) who had all left Maserati after their ten-year contract with Adolfo Orsi terminated. Ten years earlier, in 1937, the remaining Maserati brothers had sold their shares in the Bologna-based company to the Orsi family, who relocated the company headquarters to their hometown of Modena in 1940. The Maserati company remains there to this day, but the Maserati brothers once again chose Bologna to be the home for their new company.

The OSCA factory was located in San Lazzaro di Savena outside Bologna, where Maserati were originally made from 1926 to 1940. Their basic business goal was to develop an automobile to compete in the popular Italian 1,100 cc racing class.

OSCA's first automobile was the MT4, for Maserati Tipo 4 cilindri. The 1,092 cc engine, which produced  at 6,000 rpm originally, had a in-house designed block, alloy head, and the bodywork was built as a two-seater, cycle-fendered roadster. The MT4 first raced in 1948 at the Pescara Circuit and the Grand Prix of Naples, where it was driven to a win by Luigi Villoresi. The engine was modified to 1,342 cc capacity in 1949., and then enlarged to 1,453 cc in 1953. A further enlargement, this time to 1,491 cc, followed in 1954 and was given twin spark ignition in 1955 for the OSCA MT4 TN (for Tipo Nuovo, "new model"). This version is often referred to as the 1500 TN.

The all new tipo 372 DS engine has desmodromic valves and was developed from the final MT4 engine in 1957 and built exclusively for F2 or sports car racing. This car received the new name F2/S or FS 372 (depending on its intended field of competition), and five were built until 1959. One of these belonged to Sir Stirling Moss, who raced it in historic races across the globe until his retirement in 2011. Versions of this engine went on to be used in coupé and convertible models of regular Fiats from 1959 to 1966. 

The 1954 12 Hours of Sebring was won by drivers Stirling Moss and Bill Lloyd in an OSCA MT4 as part of the Briggs Cunningham Team. In 1955, a 1500 TN engined MT4 chassis with a streamliner body called the "Simpson Special" beat a number of records at the Bonneville Salt Flats. Afterwards, the car was sold to Harry Allen Chapman, heir to the Mobil fortune, who went on to take a minor share of OSCA and also replaced Edgar Fronteras as the company's US distributor.        

From 1951 to 1962, automobiles or engines made by OSCA also were entered in some Formula One and Formula Two events although they mainly built small sports cars of which some were designed by Pietro Frua. In the World Sportscar Championship OSCA ranked 10th (1953), 4th (1954), 6th (1957), 5th (1958) and 4th (1961).

The 750 cc  type S 187 was introduced in 1956. The name "187" refers to the displacement in cubic centimetres of each cylinder of the engine. In 1959 Jim Eichenlaub won the American H-Mod Title with his OSCA S 187. Operating on a shoestring budget, Eichenlaub often slept in his tow car because there was no money for a motel. However he won his first race at Pensacola in April 1959.

The Formula Junior (FJ) used a Fiat engine of 1089 cc, and saw wins by Colin Davis and Berardo Taraschi in 1959.

In 1963 the brothers sold the company to Count Domenico Agusta, owner of MV Agusta, They did design work for Agusta until 1966. One of their final designs was a desmodromic four-cylinder engine. OSCA ended operations in 1967.

OSCA Fiats
The 1500S Coupé and Convertible were available with OSCA's twin cam 1491 cc engine as the 1200 were produced with a Fiat engine. These  SAE 1500S models,  DIN went on sale in November 1959, with Pininfarina bodywork. The engine was uprated to 1568 cc and  SAE,  DIN in the summer of 1962 (1600 S, tipo 118SB) thanks to a 2 mm bore increase, and the shell underwent a facelift as the Fiat 1300/1500 replaced the original 1200 in 1963. The 1600 S continued in production until replaced by the Fiat 124 coupé/spider, which used Fiat's own twin cam engine, in late 1966. In total, 3,089 OSCA-engined Fiat Coupés and Convertibles were built.

OSCA 1600 GT 
OSCA also offered their own cars powered by the 1.6-liter derivative of Aurelio Lampredi's four-cylinder twin-cam engine, as installed in the Fiat 1600 S. These featured a tubular chassis with independent suspension at the front and rear. Of 128 OSCA 1600 cars built between 1960 and 1963, 98 were bodied by Zagato while the remaining cars were bodied by other coachbuilders such as Fissore and Touring. The Zagato cars (sometimes called 1600 GTZ) feature lightweight alloy coachwork with the company's signature "double-bubble" roof.

Vehicles
Name and year of introduction:
OSCA MT4 (1947)
OSCA S187 (1956)
OSCA 750S (1957)
OSCA 1050 Spider
OSCA 1100 FJ (for Formula Junior)
OSCA 1100 (1960)
OSCA 2000 Desmodromico (Morelli, 1959/60)
OSCA 1600 GT2 (1962)
OSCA 1600 SP (1963)

Complete Formula One World Championship results

As a constructor
(key) (results in bold indicate pole position; results in italics indicate fastest lap)

As an engine supplier
(key) (Races in bold indicate pole position; races in italics indicate fastest lap)

Notes
 – The Constructors World Championship did not exist before .

References

External links

OSCA Owners Group
 O.S.C.A. designs of Pietro Frua 
New OSCA Registry
O.S.C.A. badge

Defunct motor vehicle manufacturers of Italy
Automotive companies established in 1947
Formula One constructors
Formula One entrants
Italian auto racing teams
Italian racecar constructors
24 Hours of Le Mans teams
World Sportscar Championship teams
Italian companies established in 1947
Car manufacturers of Italy
Sports car manufacturers